Garkha Assembly constituency is an assembly constituency in Saran district in the Indian state of Bihar. It is reserved for scheduled castes.

Overview
As per Delimitation of Parliamentary and Assembly constituencies Order, 2008, No. 119 Garkha Assembly constituency (SC) is composed of the following: Garkha community development block; Badlu Tola, Lohari, Purwi Telpa, Sherpur, Bishunupura, Khalpura Bala, Maharajganj, Chirand, Jalalpur, Bhairopur Nijamat, Dumari, Musepur, Raipur Bingawa and Kotwa Patti Rampur gram panchayats of Chapra CD Block.

Garkha Assembly constituency (SC) is part of No. 20 Saran (Lok Sabha constituency). It was earlier part of Chapra (Lok Sabha constituency).

Members of Legislative Assembly

Election results

2020

References

External links
 

Assembly constituencies of Bihar
Politics of Saran district